Kurt Koffka (1886, Berlin – 1941, Northampton, Massachusetts), Jewish German psychologist
 Friedrich Koffka (1888, Berlin – 1951, London), German jurist, writer

Koffke 
 Leticia Koffke (born c. 1971), a German photomodel

Jewish surnames
Slavic-language surnames